Alice Masak French (June 29, 1930 – July 5, 2013) was an Inuit author who lived in Souris, Manitoba, Canada.  An Inuvialuit, she was born at Baillie Island in the Northwest Territories. Her work focuses on the experiences of Inuit women, and discusses the struggle to hold on to Native tradition. Her My Name is Masak (1976; translated into French as Je m'appelle Masak, 1979) is an autobiographical story about her youth in a boarding school, while The Restless Nomad (1992) continues the story up until she moves to Ireland.

References

Sources
Biography of Alice Masak French on Inuit.uqam.ca.
Kratzert, M. "Native American Literature: Expanding the Canon", Collection Building Vol. 17, 1, 1998, p. 4
 Watson, C. "Autobiographical Writing as a Healing Process: Interview with Alice Masak French. Canadian Literature/Litterature canadienne, Number 167, Winter 2006, 32-44.

1930 births
2013 deaths
Inuvialuit people
Canadian autobiographers
Canadian Inuit women
Writers from Manitoba
Inuit writers
Women autobiographers
20th-century Canadian non-fiction writers
20th-century Canadian women writers
People from Souris, Manitoba
Writers from the Northwest Territories
Inuit from the Northwest Territories
Canadian women non-fiction writers